Jürgen Melzer and Philipp Petzschner were the defending champions but Melzer decided not to participate.
Petzschner played alongside Juan Martín del Potro but lost in the quarterfinals.
Michaël Llodra and Nenad Zimonjić won the title Robert Lindstedt and Horia Tecău 4–6, 7–5, [16–14] in the final.

Seeds

Draw

Draw

External links 
 2006 ABN AMRO World Tennis Tournament Main Doubles Draw

ABN AMRO World Tennis Tournament - Doubles
2012 ABN AMRO World Tennis Tournament